Formerie is a railway station located in the commune of Formerie in the Oise department, France. The station is served by TER Hauts-de-France and TER Normandie trains from Amiens to Rouen.

According to the SNCF, the station averaged 16 passengers per operating day in 2003.

History

There was a munitions depot for the Army of the North at the station between the winter of 1915/16 and the end of the First World War.

Formerie was previously the interchange station to a metre gauge line of local interest linking Milly-sur-Thérain to Formerie via the Thérain valley. At Milly-sur-Thérain there was a connection to Beauvais on the Paris Nord - Le Tréport-Mers line. Opened on 22 October 1894, this line was closed to all traffic on 31 December 1935.

See also 
 List of SNCF stations in Hauts-de-France

References
 

Railway stations in Oise